Carola Cicconetti (born 3 January 1962) is an Italian former fencer. She competed in the women's individual and team foil events at the 1984 Summer Olympics.

References

External links
 

1962 births
Living people
Italian female fencers
Olympic fencers of Italy
Fencers at the 1984 Summer Olympics
Fencers from Rome
20th-century Italian women
21st-century Italian women